Zagirshchino is a rural locality (a selo) in Starochigolskoye Rural Settlement, Anninsky District, Voronezh Oblast, Russia. The population was 72 as of 2010.

Geography 
Zagirshchino is located 33 km south of Anna (the district's administrative centre) by road. Staraya Chigla is the nearest rural locality.

References 

Rural localities in Anninsky District